Glyptoscelis squamulata, the grape bud beetle, is a leaf beetle. The species was first described by George Robert Crotch in 1873. It is found in the western United States.

In the 1920s to 1940s, G. squamulata was considered a major pest of table grapes in Coachella Valley of southern California. It is now considered to be a minor pest.

References

Further reading

External links
 

Eumolpinae
Articles created by Qbugbot
Beetles described in 1873
Taxa named by George Robert Crotch
Beetles of the United States